Magheranerla is a townland in Athlone, County Westmeath, Ireland. The townland is in the civil parish of St. Mary's.

The townland stands to the south of the city, and is surrounded by the townland of Loughandonning, with Cartrontroy to the east.

References 

Townlands of County Westmeath